La Minute de vérité (US title: The Moment of Truth) is a 1952 French language motion picture drama directed by Jean Delannoy who co-wrote the screenplay with Henri Jeanson, Roland Laudenbach and Robert Thoeren. The film stars Michèle Morgan and Jean Gabin.

The music score is by Paul Misraki, Winfried Zillig and Georges Van Parys.

It tells the story of a doctor, his wife and his patient, who was her former lover.

Cast

External links

La Minute de vérité at Films de France

1952 films
Films directed by Jean Delannoy
Adultery in films
Films with screenplays by Roland Laudenbach
French drama films
1952 drama films
French black-and-white films
1950s French-language films
1950s French films